Thevinone is a derivative of thebaine.

References

Opioids